Pietro Palmieri (c.1925–1964) was an  Italian racing driver. He entered 20 races (18 started), in Fiats, Maseratis, Ferraris and Alfa Romeos. Among his best results were one victory and one second-place finish. After resigning from racing, he was active in horse breeding. Pietro died in a car crash in Rome on 5 March 1964 at the age of 39.

He is not to be confused with Pietro Giacomo Palmieri (1737-1804), a painter and printmaker.

Complete results

References

External links
 
 racingsportscars.com
 ferraristuff.com
 formula2.net
 ultimateracinghistory.com

1920s births
1964 deaths
Racing drivers from Rome
24 Hours of Le Mans drivers
Mille Miglia drivers